Godoberi or Ghodoberi may refer to:
 Godoberi people: A people of the Caucasus in southwestern Dagestan, Russia
 Godoberi language: Their Avar–Andic language

av:Гъодоберисел
ru:Годоберинцы
fi:Godoberit